The Believer is a 2001 American drama film directed by Henry Bean and written by Bean and Mark Jacobson. It stars Ryan Gosling as Daniel Balint, a Jew who becomes a neo-Nazi. It won the Grand Jury Prize at the 2001 Sundance Film Festival and the Golden St. George at the 23rd Moscow International Film Festival.

Background
The film is loosely based on the true story of Dan Burros, a member of the American Nazi Party and the New York branch of the United Klans of America. He committed suicide after being revealed as Jewish by a New York Times reporter.

Plot
Daniel Balint is a former Jewish yeshiva student, brilliant but troubled, who is now a fanatically violent neo-Nazi in New York in his early twenties. As a child, he often challenged his teachers with unorthodox interpretations of scripture. He once argued that the Binding of Isaac was not about Abraham's faith but God's power: that God's purpose was not to have Abraham accomplish a particular task, but rather to demand unquestioning obedience, which Abraham refuses to give; this begins his distance from religion.

Daniel finds a meeting of fascists run by Curtis Zampf and Lina Moebius, where he also makes a connection with Lina's daughter Carla. Daniel advocates killing Jews, and a banker named Manzetti in particular, but Curtis and Lina oppose harming Jews on practical if not moral grounds. Impressed with Daniel's intelligence, Lina invites him to their camp retreat in the country. Afterward, Daniel and his neo-Nazi friends pick a fight with two African-American men, get arrested, and are bailed out by Carla. He spends the night with her but returns to his ailing father's home where he is harangued by his sister Linda for his Nazi beliefs, but she also urges him to stay and have Shabbat dinner. The men watch TV, which is forbidden on Sabbath according to some Orthodox Jews, leading them to commiserate on the incomprehensibility of Jewish law.

Guy Danielsen, a journalist writing an article on hate groups, meets Daniel for an interview. He listens to Daniel's antisemitic speech, then reveals that he had been in contact with Daniel's old rabbi and knows that Daniel is Jewish. Daniel pulls out a pistol and threatens to commit suicide if Guy publishes the truth.

Daniel goes to the fascist camp retreat, where he meets Drake, a skilled marksman, along with an explosives expert. Six of the retreat participants, including Daniel, go to a Jewish deli, where they torment the owner about Jewish dietary laws until a fight breaks out. Daniel and his friends are required by a court to take sensitivity training, where they listen to the experiences of Holocaust survivors. One talks about how his infant son was murdered by a Nazi. Daniel is enraged that the man did nothing to save his son, but all the survivors assert that Daniel would also have done nothing, and he walks out in anger.

The story haunts him, and he imagines himself as the Nazi. Later that night, Daniel and the gang break into a synagogue, vandalize it, and plant a time bomb under the pulpit. They also tear, trample, and spit on a Torah scroll, though Daniel protests. After they leave, Daniel takes the scroll and a tallit katan (a small Jewish prayer cloth) with him. The next morning, the neo-Nazis hear on the news that the bomb failed to go off. Back in his cabin, Daniel puts on the tallit under his shirt and performs a combination of the Nazi salute and a Hagbaha.

Drake approaches him with a plan to kill Manzetti. Outside a temple, Daniel fires at him but misses. Drake discovers the tallit and realizes that he is a Jew, so Daniel shoots him and escapes. He continues to meet with Lina and Curtis, who want to start an above-ground movement to bring fascism into the political mainstream, inviting Jews, blacks, and liberals. Daniel reluctantly agrees to help them raise funds. At the meetings that follow, Daniel first charms, then enrages, their potential donors with his intellectual games, leading to his expulsion. When news breaks that Manzetti was killed, Lina suspects Daniel, since he proposed the assassination, but Drake is the real killer.

Carla comforts Daniel and they sleep together at his home. When she sees the stolen Torah, she asks Daniel to teach her Hebrew, ostensibly for intellectual reasons. He soon runs into an old friend and his fiancée, Stuart and Miriam, who invite him to a Rosh Hashanah service, assuming that he is an anti-racist skinhead. When Daniel arrives, another old friend calls him out as a racist skinhead. As he is leaving, Miriam, who works for the District Attorney, tells him that half of the people in Lina's meetings are informants for the D.A. She asks Daniel to record conversations at a meeting so she can help him with possible charges stemming from the Manzetti killing, but he refuses.

As Yom Kippur approaches, Daniel calls Miriam and insists on taking Stuart's place leading the Ne'ila service at the bimah on Yom Kippur. He and his friends plant a new bomb under the temple's pulpit even though they find it reinforced, limiting the explosion. When Daniel takes the pulpit the next day, he is shocked to see Carla in the congregation. He again imagines himself in the story the Holocaust survivor told him, this time as both the Nazi and the Jew. With minutes to go, Daniel stops and tells everyone to get out because there is a bomb, but refuses to leave himself.

Daniel is shown ascending the stairs in the Jewish school he left as a child. His old teacher approaches, hoping to talk about the Binding of Isaac, and suggests that Isaac died on the mountain and was reborn in the next world. But Daniel ignores him and keeps going, up, and up, as his teacher urges him to stop, calling out, "There's nothing up there."

Cast

Reception
The Believer received an 83% approval rating on Rotten Tomatoes based on 93 reviews; the average rating is 7.34 out of 10. The consensus states: "Gosling commands the screen with a raw, electrifying performance." The film also has a score of 75 on Metacritic based on 28 reviews.

Jamie Russell of BBC Films said that it was "awe-inspiring ... a late contender for one of the best films of the year—an intellectually breathtaking, profoundly moving film." Charlotte O'Sullivan of The Independent said, "It's naturally thrilling...The Believer is astonishing." Time Out said, "the film is driven by Gosling's revelatory performance ... arresting, prickly, vaguely funny, even—'difficult' in the best sense."

Todd McCarthy for Variety said, "Bean deals with the core elements of this odd, and oddly compelling, situation with admirable frankness and intelligence, but flounders around the edges. The tenets of Zampf and Moebius' political movement receive such scant attention that the scenes devoted to it are borderline ludicrous, and the masochistic impulses that seem to draw Carla to Danny—"Hurt me!," she begs at the start of their first sexual encounter, and he willingly obliges—are rote and undeveloped."

Julie Salamon for The New York Times said, "This willfully provocative film portrait (...) offers lots of raging, vulgarity and shock but little insight into the character's psychopathology. (...) The movie's most telling moment comes when Danny confronts Holocaust survivors about why they allowed themselves to be brutalized. One of them, an old man, responds by asking, And what shall we learn from you, Daniel ? It's a good question, never answered.

David Germain for The Washington Post said, "Even as he commits hate crimes and becomes an anti-Jewish rabble-rouser, the youth is torn between contempt for Jewish passivity during the Holocaust and reverence for the traditions of Judaism."

See also
 Antisemitism in the United States
 American History X

References

External links

 
 
 
 
 

2001 films
2000s coming-of-age drama films
American coming-of-age drama films
American independent films
2001 independent films
2000s English-language films
2000s Hebrew-language films
Antisemitism in the United States
Films about antisemitism
Films about fascists
Films about Jews and Judaism
Films about race and ethnicity
Films about racism in the United States
Films about neo-Nazism
Films about anti-fascism
Sundance Film Festival award winners
Fireworks Entertainment films
2001 drama films
2001 multilingual films
American multilingual films
2000s American films